This is a list of hhospitals in Uruguay.

Public hospitals 

Most public hospitals in Uruguay are managed by the State Health Services Administration. In the case of Montevideo, of the nine state hospitals, the vast majority are managed by the State Health Services Administration, with the exception of the university hospital, the Canzani sanatorium and those reserved for the care of personnel from the armed forces, police and injured workers. 

There are also departmental hospitals, and a set of primary care centers, with emergency services and family medicine. In the case of the department and city of Montevideo, there is a network of 95 state polyclinics distributed in different neighborhoods of Montevideo. To this are added the 21 neighborhood polyclinics, managed by the Department of Health of the Municipality of Montevideo, these are mostly located in neighborhoods with critical contexts. There are also maternal and child centers, today called the Bank of Social Security.

Private hospitals 

There are also, and mainly in Montevideo, a set of medical assistance corporations. Which are called mutualists. 

Uruguay

Hospitals
Uruguay